Gjelsvik Spur is a rock spur  northwest of Mount Ayres on the Butcher Ridge, in the Cook Mountains of Antarctica. It was named after Per Gjelsvik of the University of Wisconsin–Madison aeromagnetic project under John Behrendt, 1963–64. Working from U.S. Navy aircraft, Gjelsvik acquired aeromagnetic profiles over the Transantarctic Mountains bordering the Ross Sea and Ross Ice Shelf.

References

External links

Ridges of the Ross Dependency
Hillary Coast